Superbike 2000 is a motorcycle racing video game, developed by Milestone s.r.l. and published by EA Sports for Microsoft Windows and PlayStation in 2000. It is part of EA's Superbike video game series.

Reception

The PC version received favorable reviews, while the PlayStation version received mixed reviews, according to the review aggregation website GameRankings.

References

External links
 

2000 video games
EA Sports games
Electronic Arts games
Milestone srl games
PlayStation (console) games
Racing video games
Superbike World Championship
Superbike World Championship video games
Video games developed in Italy
Windows games
Multiplayer and single-player video games